Linda Woolverton (born December 19, 1952) is an American screenwriter, playwright, and novelist, whose most prominent works include the screenplays and books of several acclaimed Disney films and stage musicals. She is the first woman to have written an animated feature for Disney, Beauty and the Beast (1991), which is also the first animated film ever to be nominated for Best Picture (at the Academy Awards). She also co-wrote the screenplay of The Lion King (1994), provided additional story material for Mulan (1998), and adapted her own Beauty and the Beast screenplay into the book of the Broadway adaptation of the film, for which she received a Tony Award nomination and won an Olivier Award.

Her recent work includes the screenplays for Alice in Wonderland (2010) and Maleficent (2014), both of which were significant box office successes. The former made her the first female screenwriter with a sole writing credit on a film that grossed $1 billion dollars. She subsequently wrote the screenplays of the sequels for both of those films—Alice Through the Looking Glass (2016) and Maleficent: Mistress of Evil (2019).

Early life and education
Woolverton was born in 1952 in Long Beach, California. As a child, she began acting in the local children's theater as an escape from what she has described as a "traumatic childhood." She graduated from high school in 1969 with honors in the school's theater program. She attended the California State University, Long Beach, graduating with a BFA in Theater Arts in 1973. After the college graduation, she attended the California State University, Fullerton, to receive a Master's degree in theater for children.

Career

First works
Upon the completion of her master's degree, Woolverton formed her own children's theater company. She wrote, directed and performed all over California in churches, malls, schools, and local theaters. She also began to work as a creative drama instructor in 1979. In 1980, she began working as a secretary for CBS, where she eventually became a programming executive concentrating on both children's and late-night programming. During her lunch breaks, Woolverton wrote her first novel, the young adult Star Wind. After quitting her job in 1984 and starting working as a substitute teacher, she wrote her second novel, the also young adult Running Before the Wind. Released in 1986 and 1987, respectively, both were published by Houghton Mifflin.

During this time, Woolverton began penning scripts for children's television shows. From 1986 to 1989, she wrote episodes for animated series as Star Wars: Ewoks, Dennis the Menace, The Real Ghostbusters, The Berenstain Bears, My Little Pony and Chip 'n Dale Rescue Rangers. After growing tired of writing for animated television shows, she expressed interest in working for Disney's theatrical animation studio, but was discouraged by her agent, who assessed that she "wasn't ready." Not agreeing with it, Woolverton went over to Disney offices in Burbank, California, and dropped off a copy of Running Before the Wind to a secretary, asking her to "give it to somebody to read." Two days later, she received a call from Jeffrey Katzenberg, then-Disney studio chairman, scheduling her for an interview.

Works for Disney
Woolverton was hired to write the script for Disney Feature Animation's Beauty and the Beast, thus becoming the first woman to write an animated feature for the studio. From early 1985 to 1988, two different teams of writers had taken a turn at adapting Jeanne-Marie Le Prince de Beaumont's tale into a feature film, but Woolverton succeeded by incorporating her own ideas into the story, such as making the protagonist a bookaholic. Upon its release in 1991, Beauty and the Beast received universal critical acclaim, becoming the first animated film ever to be nominated for the Academy Award for Best Picture, and winning the Golden Globe Award for Best Motion Picture – Musical or Comedy.

The success of Beauty and the Beast led Woolverton to work in several projects with Disney. She co-wrote the screenplay of the live-action film Homeward Bound: The Incredible Journey, released in 1993, and worked again with Disney Animation by helping the pre-production story development of Aladdin, released in 1992, and co-writing the screenplay of The Lion King, released in 1994. Both Aladdin and The Lion King were noted box office successes and received critical acclaim. During this time, she also adapted her own Beauty and the Beast screenplay into a Broadway musical, which opened to critical acclaim in 1994, leading her to be nominated for a Tony Award for Best Book in a Musical and to win an Olivier Award for Best New Musical. She provided additional story material for Mulan, released in 1998, and co-wrote the book of the stage musical Aida, which opened on Broadway in 2000 to critical acclaim.

In 2007, she completed a screenplay where an older Alice, from Lewis Carroll's Alice's Adventures in Wonderland, returns to Wonderland, from an idea she had in her head for many years. She presented the screenplay to producers Suzanne Todd, Jennifer Todd, and Joe Roth, who took it to Disney. The studio immediately accepted the project, attaching Tim Burton to direct. Released in 2010, Alice in Wonderland earned more than $1 billion at the worldwide box office, making Woolverton the first female screenwriter with a sole writing credit on a film that grossed $1 billion dollars.  

In 2010, Disney invited her to write the screenplay of Maleficent, a retelling of the animated film Sleeping Beauty from the point of view of the titular villain. As with Beauty and the Beast, the film had been in development hell until Woolverton was attached to write it. She later described her version of the tale as a complete "reinvention, not just the retelling of the same story." Maleficent was released in 2014.

She subsequently wrote the screenplays of the sequels for both of those films—Alice Through the Looking Glass (2016) and Maleficent: Mistress of Evil (2019).

Other works
Woolverton wrote the book of the Broadway musical Lestat, an adaptation of The Vampire Chronicles by Anne Rice, which pre-debuted in 2005 in San Francisco to become the highest-earning pre-Broadway play in the city's history. The musical opened on Broadway in 2006. She co-wrote the narration script of the National Geographic theatrical documentary film Arctic Tale, released in 2007. In 2014, she announced that she was pitching a pilot for a television series. It was later announced that Lifetime had decided to adapt the novel The Clan of the Cave Bear with Woolverton as executive-producer of the series and writer of the pilot episode. The adaptation eventually was released as a television film.

Themes

"Strong female characters"

Woolverton's works are known for their "strong female characters." She is recognized for having paved the way inside Disney for the creation of strong female protagonists, mainly due to her writing of Belle, the protagonist of Beauty and the Beast. Belle is an intelligent and strong young woman, a Disney heroine who does "something other than wait for her prince to come." Empire hailed Belle as "a feminist heroine who [is] more rounded than previous Disney characters." Woolverton herself said that Belle "moved us forward a few inches. She was a reader. She didn't rely on her beauty to get herself through the world. She wasn't a victim waiting for her prince to come. She was a proactive character."

In Alice in Wonderland, she gave the protagonist Alice Kingsleigh an adventurous, inquisitive, nonconforming personality, which leads the character to question the values of the Victorian society, and ultimately dismantle an engagement to become a world explorer. For this, Elle said: "In her version of Wonderland, she [Woolverton] gave audiences a female character that was not dependent on a man for happiness or commercial success." Describing her work in the film, Woolverton said: "My whole point in Alice was that you have to forge your own path. You can't go down anybody else's [road]. It's your dream; it's your life. You don't have to be told by other people what to make of yourself. You decide."

Reflecting on her female characters, Woolverton said: "I came up as a feminist, in my day. And when I was first approached to do Beauty and the Beast, I knew that you couldn’t do a throwback Disney victim/heroine. We weren’t going to buy it as women after a whole awakening in the 70s. No one is going to accept that. So that started me on a path at relooking at these Disney princesses in a sort of different way. I feel that you have to have an empowering message or you’re not going to be relevant. If you don't stay relevant to how people are and how women are approaching life now, it’s not going to feel true."

Personal life
Woolverton is divorced from producer Lee Flicker, with whom she has a daughter together, named Keaton, born in 1991. She lives in Hancock Park, Los Angeles, and has two dogs. She is represented by United Talent Agency.

Works

Films

Theatrical productions

Novels

Television

Awards and nominations
Tony Award
 Nomination for Best Book of a Musical for Beauty and the Beast (1994)

Laurence Olivier Award
WINNER for Best New Musical for Beauty and the Beast (1998)Newport Beach Film Festival
WINNER for Outstanding Contribution to Screenwriting (2016)

References

External links
 
 
  (archive)
 Linda Woolverton  Video produced by Makers: Women Who Make America''

1952 births
Living people
American women screenwriters
American women dramatists and playwrights
Animation screenwriters
California State University, Fullerton alumni
California State University, Long Beach alumni
Walt Disney Animation Studios people
Writers from Long Beach, California
American feminist writers
Screenwriters from California
20th-century American dramatists and playwrights
20th-century American novelists
20th-century American screenwriters
20th-century American women writers
21st-century American dramatists and playwrights
21st-century American screenwriters
21st-century American women writers
Women science fiction and fantasy writers